Cannon Hill may refer to any of the following places:

Australia
 Cannon Hill, Northern Territory, a tiny outstation in Arnhem Land
 Cannon Hill, Queensland, a suburb of Brisbane
 Cannon Hill Anglican College
 Cannon Hill bus station
 Cannon Hill railway station
 Cannon Hill State School

United Kingdom
 Cannon Hill Park, Birmingham
 Cannon Hill, Merton, a suburb of London
 Cannon Hill Common
 Cannon Hill tube station

United States
 Cannon Hill (Chatham, Massachusetts), a mountain
 Cannon Hill (Wellfleet, Massachusetts), a mountain